The Serebryanka (also: Серебряная - Serebryanaya) is a river in Sverdlovsk Oblast in Russia, a right tributary of the Chusovaya (Kama basin). The Serebryanka freezes up in November and stays icebound until April.

References 

Rivers of Sverdlovsk Oblast